Incitement to terrorism is a category in some national legal systems which may criminalize direct encouragement of acts of violence or praise for proscribed terrorist organizations. It was also prohibited by United Nations Security Council Resolution 1624 in 2005.

Overview

Legal scholars Daphne Barak-Erez and David Scharia have identified a difference in approach between European and United States laws criminalizing incitement to terrorism; the former tend to focus on the content of the speech and whether it supports terrorist violence, while the latter focuses on whether the speaker is linked to proscribed organizations. The European approach involves explicit limits on freedom of speech, while the United States approach is more indirect.

Incitement is an inchoate offense and is punishable even if no causal connection with a terror attack is proven. Merely establishing terrorism as a potential result of the speech is sufficient.

One major motivation for criminalizing incitement to terrorism is its potential usefulness as an upstream prevention for deadly terror attacks. Some experts even argue that incitement is a sine qua non for terrorist attacks.

International law
United Nations Security Council Resolution 1624, unanimously adopted in 2005, is the first international legal instrument which deals with incitement to terrorism. It was prompted by the 2005 London bombings. United Nations Security Council Resolution 1963 authorizes the Counter-Terrorism Committee of the Security Council to monitor the passage of laws criminalizing incitement to terrorism in member states.

European law

The Council of Europe adopted the Convention on the Prevention of Terrorism, also in 2005, which requires member countries to pass legislation to criminalize the "public provocation to commit a terrorist offence". This does not cover apologia for terrorism.  Although the European Convention on Human Rights protects freedom of expression, incitement is not protected. In Zana v. Turkey, the European Court of Human Rights ruled that Mehdi Zana's free speech rights were not violated when he was punished by Turkey for calling PKK, a proscribed terrorist organization, a "national liberation movement". In Leroy v. France, cartoonist Denis Leroy's conviction and fine for glorifying the September 11 attacks under French law was upheld by the ECHR.

By country

France
Article 24 of the Press Law of 1881 criminalizes the incitement and advocacy of terrorism, as well as apologia for terrorism. , the penalty was up to  five years  imprisonment  and/or  a  fine up to 45,000  euros.

Israel
Barak-Erez and Scharia identify Israel as belonging to the European tradition, in part because of its legal system's origins in British law.

The Prevention of Terrorism Ordinance, enacted in 1948, remains in force, and was for many years the primary provision criminalizing incitement to terrorism. This ordinance empowers the government to designate terrorist organizations and criminalizes being a member of or supporting such a group. Section 4 of the ordinance states that:

In Jabareen v. State of Israel, the Supreme Court of Israel found that the Prevention of Terrorism Ordinance applied only to designated terrorist organizations rather than the promotion of acts of violence more generally. Following this case, the Knesset replaced Section 4  with a new section, 144D2, which extends the prohibition to incitement of terrorist actions not connected to terrorist organizations.

Spain
Article  18.1  of  the  Spanish Penal Code criminalizes provocation to commit any criminal offense and by extension apologia for criminal offenses. Organic Law No. 7/2000 explicitly prohibits, with a penalty of one to two years' imprisonment:

United Kingdom
The Terrorism Act 2006 created the offence of encouragement to terrorism, which prohibits "a statement that is likely to be understood by some or all of the members of the public to whom it is published as a direct or indirect encouragement or other inducement to them to the commission, preparation or instigation of acts of terrorism or Convention offences." Indirect encouragement statements include "every statement which glorifies the commission or preparation (whether in the past, in the future or generally) of such acts or offences". However, they are only criminalized if the speaker intends to cause others to commit terrorist offences.

United States
Because of the First Amendment, incitement to terrorism or other forms of crime and unlawful violence is constitutionally protected free speech, unless it can be proven that the speech is "directed to inciting or producing imminent lawless action" and "is likely to incite or produce such action". However, in 2010 Holder v. Humanitarian Law Project, the Supreme Court ruled that "a  criminal  prohibition  on advocacy carried out in coordination with, or at the direction of, a foreign terrorist organization  is  constitutionally  permissible". This is because such statements constitute material support for terrorism. Some defendants, including Javed Iqbal, who helped the Hezbollah TV station Al-Manar to broadcast, have been convicted of providing material support for terrorism under United States law.

Conflict with free speech
Incitement to terrorism offenses are considered by some to be an unjustified infringement of free speech rights, and it is argued that general encouragement of terrorism may be a political statement rather than literal encouragement to commit terrorist offenses. However, some advocates of criminalization, such as Yaël Ronen, believe that it is possible and desirable to criminalize a definition of incitement to terrorism which does not excessively infringe freedom of speech.

See also 
 Counterterrorism
 Incitement to genocide
 Stochastic terrorism
 Terroristic threat

Notes

References

Sources

Further reading

Terrorism laws
Inchoate offenses
Speech crimes